L'Antiga Esquerra de l'Eixample is a neighborhood in the Eixample district of Barcelona, Catalonia (Spain). Originally formed a single unit, called Esquerra de l'Eixample, with the current neighborhood la Nova Esquerra de l'Eixample.

Antiga Esquerra de l'Eixample, la
Antiga Esquerra de l'Eixample, la